JCall is a nonprofit advocacy group based in Europe to lobby the European parliament on foreign policy issues concerning the Middle East and Israel in particular. They say they are based along the lines of the America group J Street, founded in 2007. They say they are "committed to the state of Israel and critical of the current choices of its government." The group is considered to be leftist.

Background
The initiative to form JCall came amidst increasing criticism of Israeli policies from Jewish groups in Israel, the US and Europe. Along these lines, JCall has said their founding ideas are similar to J Street, a group of left-of-centre American Jews. Many members are from France, where, just weeks before the founding, a street was named after Israel's first premier, David Ben-Gurion, which had also met with such criticism as unfurling a Palestinian flag on the Avenue des Champs-Élysées.

The founding of JCall was also read as a movement to urge the European Union to pressure Israel to "end the occupation in Judea and Samaria and sign a peace treaty with the Palestinians in line with the two-state doctrine."

Membership
The founding leader of the group, David Chemla was born in Tunisia and raised in France. He was a former IDF officer who served in the Yom Kippur War in the Paratroopers Brigade. He left for France in 1977 after 10 years in Israel. He is chairman of Peace Now in France. He said the group seeks to support Israel's long-term future because "as friends, as Jews, we want to tell you that you are going down a wrong path. I think our initiative is actually helping Israel's image in Europe. It is a pretty low image over here these days, because of what happened in Gaza, mainly, and it is commonly believed in Europe that Israel is the provocative, negative side of the conflict—the one that is blocking the peace process." He claimed that "We’re not saying that only Israel is responsible for the problem. As Jews tied to Israel, we speak to the Israelis. So this is a call to the Israelis, but of course [the Palestinians] have a lot of the responsibility for the continuation of the conflict." He affirmed, on behalf of the membership that "our connection to the state of Israel is part of our identity," but in Europe "Israel is seen as responsible for all the problems [in the region]." Chemla added that the group's was not a movement as such after the first petition but hoped to become one.

Patrick Klugman, a French lawyer and spokesman for the groups said the foundation "comes from the European Jewish communities who are profoundly attached to Israel and who want to say that current Israeli policies are both a source of anxiety for us and a source of insecurity in the long term for Israel as well as a source of injustice for the Palestinians."

Attendance at the inaugural JCall meet also featured Israeli professor Zeev Sternhell, former ambassador to France Eli Bar-Navi, and former envoy to Germany Avi Primor. The organisers of the meet said they sought to ensure Israel's well-being and existence as a Jewish and democratic state through immediately working to establish two states.

2010 petition
The group's first act was a petition to the European parliament entitled "Call for Reason," which considers the Israeli occupation and settlements "morally and politically wrong." They consider the occupation and settlements a threat because it "feed[s] the unacceptable delegitimisation process that Israel currently faces abroad."

A competing petition launched by several French intellectuels "Raison garder" defending the state of Israel was launched on April 25. A few days later this petition bypassed completely JCall.

Reaction

Support
A former member of the Knesset, Yossi Sarid, said the group's members "are people who seize every opportunity to defend Israel publicly and remain faithful to it. Even during Operation Cast Lead and after the Goldstone report they were on Israel's side. The State of Israel is the apple of their eye in good times, and especially in bad."

Professor Sternhell drew parallels with J Street in showing American Jews that supporting Israel does not suggest an endorsement of any policy adopted by Israeli governments. "The Israeli government should be pressured from three directions: The US administration, European governments and the Jewish communities. They must have a voice in the matter."

Neutral response
The Israeli Foreign Ministry wished not to comment because the group was not government sponsored.

Criticism
Yael Kahn, chair of the UK-based Islington Friends of Yibna said that while she pleased to see openly criticism of Israeli policies, she also found that the petition was "wholly inappropriate, due to its failure to mention the fact that these settlements are illegal. I am utterly appalled by the failure of the petition to mention Gaza and the barbaric siege Israel imposes on the 1.5 million Palestinians living there. It is outrageous to not speak out against the Israeli restrictions on the amount of food Palestinians in Gaza are allowed to have."

The president of the French-based CRIF did not sign the petition because of objections to some of its language and its tone.

The European Jewish Congress said the group's aims were "counter-productive, unhelpful and disuniting [in that it] applauds the very difficult concessions [in pursuit of negotiations and the consequent] increase in access and movement for the Palestinians by removing two-thirds of all road-blocks and the settlement moratorium." They said JCall's initiative was "one-sided pressure on Israel [which] does not encourage the Palestinians to engage in serious negotiations and only endangers the already unstable situation in the region. While there has been consistent pressure on Israel it is important, especially for the EU, to place pressure on the Palestinian Authority to end its incitement, rhetoric and hate education."

The Jerusalem Post called JCall the zeitgeist because it was "a group of Jews ... who, while supporting the existence of Israel, don't trust the intentions of its government and seek to bring foreign pressure to bear in changing its behavior." It pointed out that criticism has also come from the Belgian communal umbrella organizations, the CCOJB. While it has faced "'praise' from some of Israel's avowed enemies, such as the Iranian regime’s Press TV Web site’s glowing report about the group’s 'stand against Israel.'"

JCall also faced criticism from the Arab/Palestinian side where it was seen as seeking to have "the world to adopt the idea of a 'Jewish and democratic state,' with which Jews of the world must be in solidarity at any price, a state that will be democratic for Jews and Jewish for Palestinians. " It was pointed out that there were no Palestinians at JCall, Gaza was not mentioned, the Right of Return for Palestinian refugees did not feature, and there was no mention of the right of all residents of Israel to full citizenship. It added that the decision for a solution was seen as solely an Israeli matter, instead of the result of Palestinian-Israeli discussions. They said JCall's did not hide their motivation for saving the existing and security of the state of Israel, amid the fear of its delegitimisation, while not mentioning international law.

Some radical left groups also said JCall "legitimizes a racist Israel."

See also
 Jewish lobby
 American Israel Public Affairs Committee
 J Street
 Yachad (NGO)

References

External links
Official site

Zionist organizations
Middle East peace efforts
Israeli–Palestinian peace process
Israeli–Palestinian conflict
Non-governmental organizations involved in the Israeli–Palestinian conflict